Cinaglio is a comune (municipality) in the Province of Asti in the Italian region Piedmont, located about  southeast of Turin and about  northwest of Asti.

Cinaglio borders the following municipalities: Asti, Camerano Casasco, Chiusano d'Asti, Cortandone, Monale, and Settime.

Demographic evolution

References

External links
 www.comune.cinaglio.at.it

Cities and towns in Piedmont